Kpekple (also referred to as kpokpoi) is a kind of food eaten by the Gas of Ghana during the celebration of Homowo festival, which is to hoot at hunger. It is prepared with the primary ingredients of steamed and fermented corn meal, palm nut soup and smoked fish. Kpekple is usually sprinkled around by the chief believing that the ancestors would be pleased by the offering.

Ingredients 

Corn meal
Palm nuts
Onions
Pepper
Water
Tomatoes
Okro
Fish
Salt

See also
 List of porridges
 List of soups

References 

Ghanaian cuisine
Maize dishes